Aniello Salzano (born 20 July 1991) is an Italian footballer who plays for  club Sangiuliano.

Club career
On 31 January 2019, he joined Livorno on loan.

References

1991 births
Footballers from Naples
Living people
Italian footballers
Serie A players
Serie B players
Serie C players
Serie D players
Venezia F.C. players
F.C. Crotone players
S.S.C. Bari players
A.C. Tuttocuoio 1957 San_Miniato players
Ternana Calcio players
U.S. Livorno 1915 players
F.C. Sangiuliano City players
Association football midfielders